William Kaula may refer to:

 William Jurian Kaula (1871–1953), American watercolor painter
 William M. Kaula (1926–2000), Australian-born American geophysicist